The Treaty of Finckenstein, often spelled Finkenstein, was a treaty concluded between France and Persia (Iran) in the Finckenstein Palace (now Kamieniec, Poland) on 4 May 1807 and formalised the Franco-Persian alliance.

Napoleon I guaranteed the integrity of Persia, recognized part of Georgia and the other parts of Transcaucasia and a part of the North Caucasus (Dagestan) as Fath Ali Shah's possession, and was to make all possible efforts for restoring those territories to him. Napoleon also promised to furnish the Shah with arms, officers and workmen. France on its side required the Shah to declare war against the United Kingdom, to expel all British people from Persia, and to maintain an open way if France wanted to attack British possessions in the far east. Despite the Treaty of Finckenstein, France failed to win a diplomatic war around Persia and none of the terms of the treaty were realized. On 12 March 1809, the United Kingdom signed a treaty with Persia forcing the French out of that country.

References

See also 
Franco-Persian alliance
Pierre Amédée Jaubert
Claude Matthieu, Count Gardane
François Mulard
List of treaties

Finckenstein
Early Modern history of Georgia (country)
1807 in France
1807 in Iran
1807 treaties
Russo-Persian Wars
History of the Caucasus
Finckenstein
Finckenstein
France–Iran relations